Tim Easterby (born 13 September 1961) is a British racehorse trainer based in North Yorkshire.

Easterby took over the Habton Grange stables in North Yorkshire from his father, Peter Easterby, in February 1996.  He has trained a Classic winner, Bollin Eric, in the 2002 St Leger Stakes at Doncaster and had Group 1 wins with Pipalong, Fayr Jag,  Somnus and Winter Power.

Peter Easterby also trained Night Nurse, who was successful in the Champion Hurdle on two occasions and in 1981 was narrowly denied a Cheltenham Gold Cup triumph by Little Owl, also trained by Peter Easterby.

Tim's uncle Mick Easterby is also a racehorse trainer.

References
Tim Easterby's website

Living people
1961 births
British racehorse trainers
People from Malton, North Yorkshire